The Wire is a fictional television drama series produced by the Home Box Office network. The fifth season of the show included a focus on the media and in particular a fictionalized version of The Baltimore Sun. The series introduced many new characters who were professional journalists.

Editorial staff

Rebecca Corbett

Played by: Kara Quick
Appears in: 
Season five: "More With Less", "Unconfirmed Reports", "Not for Attribution" (uncredited), "Took", and "–30–."
Rebecca Corbett is the paper's Regional Affairs Desk Editor.

She is named after real-life former Baltimore Sun editor Rebecca Corbett.

Augustus Haynes

Augustus "Gus" Haynes is the city desk editor for the paper and is a principled but unrefined presence in the newsroom. Haynes is played by Clark Johnson.

James Whiting
Played by: Sam Freed
Appears in: 
Season five: "More With Less", "Unconfirmed Reports", "Not for Attribution", "Transitions", "React Quotes", "The Dickensian Aspect", "Took", "Late Editions", and "–30–."
James Whiting is the paper's executive editor and is responsible for guiding the paper's reporting. He has ambitions of winning a Pulitzer prize for his paper and his fascination with the "Dickensian aspect" of stories leaves him often out-of-touch with the problems facing the city. His managing editor is a colleague from their days working in Philadelphia, Thomas Klebanow. Klebanow handles the day-to-day running of the paper and the handling of cutbacks from the paper's owners. 

He is interested in pursuing stories that stir emotion in the reader over those that examine the context and roots of social problems facing the city. Whiting values his network of connections in the industry, and used his authority to prevent the paper from publishing a negative story about shortfalls in racial integration at the University of Maryland to protect his old friend Gene Robbins, the dean of journalism.  Whiting is based on former Baltimore Sun editor John Carroll.

Thomas Klebanow
Played by: David Costabile
Appears in: 
Season five: "More With Less", "Unconfirmed Reports", "Not for Attribution", "Transitions", "React Quotes", "The Dickensian Aspect", "Took", "Clarifications", and "–30–."
Thomas Klebanow is the paper's managing editor and is responsible for the day-to-day running of the paper. Klebanow is renowned for hiring young female reporters with questionable writing skills. He worked with executive editor James Whiting at The Philadelphia Inquirer and followed him to The Baltimore Sun. Klebanow is often left with the responsibility for cutbacks and buyouts by Whiting.
 
He comes across as vain and lacking character strength, but he has a good sense of the bottom line and the potential of a story to draw readers. Klebanow chairs the daily budget meetings and decides how much space to allocate to each story.  Klebanow is based on former Baltimore Sun managing editor Bill Marimow, whom series creator David Simon despises.

Tim Phelps
Played by: Thomas J. McCarthy
Appears in: 
Season five: "More With Less", "Unconfirmed Reports", "Transitions" (uncredited), "React Quotes", and "–30–."
Tim Phelps is the editor of the paper's State Desk. He is pressured by cuts to staff and funding. Phelps is particularly displeased to be beaten to a story by the Daily Record. Phelps is a smoker and often spends time on the loading dock with his colleagues Gus Haynes, Roger Twigg and Jeff Price.

He is named after Timothy Phelps, the state editor during David Simon's tenure at the Baltimore Sun.

Phelps is played by actor Thomas J. McCarthy. Another journalist character named Scott Templeton is played by a different Tom McCarthy. In the David Simon-written Homicide: Life On The Street episode "Wu's On First", Thomas J. McCarthy played a Baltimore Sun editor who has come from Philadelphia obsessed with winning Pulitzers, not unlike Whiting or Klebanow.

Steven Luxenberg
Played by: Robert Poletick
Appears in: 
Season five: "More With Less", "Not for Attribution" (uncredited), "React Quotes", "The Dickensian Aspect", "Clarifications", "Late Editions", and "–30–."
Steven Luxenberg is the editor of the metro section and oversees other editors including Rebecca on Regional Affairs, Phelps on State Desk and Gus Haynes on City Desk. Luxenberg is a hands-on editor and likes to watch his writers as they work. His section lost its transportation reporter in the last round of buyouts.

He is named after real-life former Baltimore Sun editor Steve Luxenberg.

Jay Spry
Played by: Donald Neal
Appears in
Season five: "More With Less;" "Unconfirmed Reports;" "Transitions;" "The Dickensian Aspect" (uncredited); "Clarifications"; "Late Editions"; and "–30–."
Jay Spry is the overnight copy editor, or rewrite man, for the metro desk of the paper. He is a veteran reporter and now takes pride in ensuring the standards of the paper are maintained. He has a dry sense of humor and is diligent, detail-oriented and a veritable newsroom wordsmith. He often has to correct the mistakes of younger reporters like Alma Gutierrez.

He is named after Jay Spry, the rewrite man during David Simon's tenure at the Baltimore Sun.

Reporters

Alma Gutierrez

Alma Gutierrez is an eager and talented young reporter. Gutierrez is played by Michelle Paress. Paress' spouse, Lawrence Gilliard, Jr., portrayed D'Angelo Barksdale in the first two seasons of the show.

Scott Templeton

Scott Templeton is an unscrupulous and ambitious young reporter. Templeton is played by Tom McCarthy.

Jeff Price
Played by: Todd Scofield
Appears in:
Season three: "Dead Soldiers" (uncredited)
Season five: "More With Less"; "Unconfirmed Reports"; "Not for Attribution"; "Transitions"; "Took" (uncredited); "Clarifications"; "Late Editions" (uncredited)
Jeff Price is the city hall reporter for the metro desk. He has covered the beat since before Tommy Carcetti became Mayor and was once leaked a story about police department funding by Carcetti. His experience has given him a touch of complacency. Price misses a potential story in the zoning section of a council meeting agenda that is picked up by his editor Gus Haynes. Price is quick to explore the story further and Haynes still gives Price full credit for finding the story.

Bill Zorzi
Played by: William F. Zorzi
Appears in:
Season one: "The Buys"
Season five: "More With Less", "Transitions", "React Quotes", "The Dickensian Aspect", "Took", "Clarifications", "Late Editions", and "–30–."
Bill Zorzi is a veteran reporter for The Baltimore Sun facing an increased workload since the last round of buyouts. He is now covering the courthouse and working the rewrite position on the weekend. He is an acerbic and profane presence, particularly when his workload increases. Zorzi often smokes with his colleagues Phelps, Twigg, Haynes and Price.

Mike Fletcher
Played by: Brandon Young
Appears in: 
Season five: "More With Less", "Not for Attribution", "Transitions" (uncredited), "React Quotes", "The Dickensian Aspect", "Took", "Clarifications", "Late Editions", and "–30–."
Mike "Fletch" Fletcher is a general assignments reporter for the metro desk of the paper. He is a talented writer but sometimes struggles to submit his work in time for deadlines. Fletch has a relaxed approach to his work and a sometimes flippant attitude. While he is still young he is savvy enough to know that a victim's background is more important than good writing in getting a murder story on the front page. Fletch's failure to meet deadlines earns him a reproach from city desk editor Gus Haynes.

While researching a feature on the homeless, Fletcher gets to know Bubbles, spending a considerable amount of time with him over a span of a few weeks, 
while Bubbles acts as Fletcher's guide to the city's homeless population. Fletcher visits Bubbles in various settings: the soup kitchen where he volunteers, an NA meeting, and while selling newspapers.

After getting his permission, Fletcher publishes an article about Bubbles.  The article was favorably received by both Haynes and Bubbles. Fletcher is promoted to city desk editor after Haynes is demoted. The quality and depth of Fletcher's article about Bubbles is in contrast to what David Simon says is a major theme of the season: The Sun misses the important stories about the city. Fletcher may be based on former Baltimore Sun reporter Michael A. Fletcher, now at The Undefeated.

Roger Twigg
Played by: Bruce Kirkpatrick
Appears in: 
Season five: "More With Less", "Unconfirmed Reports", "Not for Attribution", "Transitions"
Roger Twigg is a veteran police reporter for the City Desk. He has been working at The Baltimore Sun for twenty years. Twigg has heard enough tall tales to see a newspaperman's joke coming long before the punchline and his humble attitude and wealth of police department sources often enable him to get the truth on a story. 

Twigg often smokes with editors Tim Phelps and Gus Haynes. Haynes dispatched Twigg to report on a rowhouse fire that Haynes spots from the Newsroom window. He left the Sun after accepting a buyout, depriving the Sun of its most senior police reporter, and leaving Alma Gutierrez in the position of senior cop reporter.

References

 
Wire, The